The arc measurement of Delambre and Méchain was a geodetic survey carried out by Jean-Baptiste Delambre and Pierre Méchain in 1792–1798 to measure an arc section of the Paris meridian between Dunkirk and Barcelona. This arc measurement served as the basis for the original definition of the metre.

In 1791, the French Academy of Sciences chose to define the metre as one ten-millionth of the distance from the equator to the North or South Pole.  This replaced the earlier definition based on the period of a pendulum, because the force of Earth's gravity varies slightly over the surface of the Earth, which affects the period of a pendulum. To establish a universally accepted foundation for the definition of the metre, more accurate measurements of a meridian were needed. The French Academy of Sciences commissioned an expedition led by Jean Baptiste Joseph Delambre and Pierre Méchain, lasting from 1792 to 1799, which attempted to accurately measure the distance between a belfry in Dunkerque and Montjuïc castle in Barcelona to estimate the length of the meridian arc through Dunkerque. This portion of the meridian, assumed to be the same length as the Paris meridian, was to serve as the basis for the length of the quarter meridian connecting the North Pole with the Equator. The problem with this approach is that the exact shape of the Earth is not a simple mathematical shape, such as a sphere or oblate spheroid, at the level of precision required for defining a standard of length. The irregular and particular shape of the Earth smoothed to sea level is represented by a mathematical model called a geoid, which literally means "Earth-shaped". Despite these issues, in 1793 France adopted this definition of the metre as its official unit of length based on provisional results from this expedition. However, it was later determined that the first prototype metre bar was short by about 200 micrometres because of miscalculation of the flattening of the Earth, making the prototype about 0.02% shorter than the original proposed definition of the metre. Regardless, this length became the French standard and was progressively adopted by other countries in Europe. This is why the polar circumference of the Earth is 40,008 km, instead of 40,000.

See also
Cartography of France
Earth's circumference#Historical use in the definition of units of measurement
Earth radius#History
History of geodesy#Prime meridian and standard of length
History of the metre#Meridional definition
Meridian arc#17th and 18th centuries
Metre#Meridional definition
Paris meridian#The West Europe-Africa Meridian-arc

References

Geodetic surveys